Arisaema is a large and diverse genus of the flowering plant family Araceae. The largest concentration of species is in China and Japan, with other species native to other parts of southern Asia  as well as eastern and central Africa, Mexico and eastern North America.  Asiatic species are often called cobra lilies, while western species are often called jack-in-the-pulpit; both names refer to the distinctive appearance of the flower, which consists of an erect central spadix rising from a spathe.

Classification and relationships
The closest relatives of Arisaema appear to be Pinellia and Typhonium (although the latter as defined in 2004 seems to be paraphyletic, having given rise to Arisaema and other genera). One unusual trait shared by all Arisaema species, and not those of other genera, is the sex change or act of Sequential hermaphroditism. Arisaema plants are typically male when small, and female or hermaphroditic when large, with a single plant capable of changing sex based on nutrition and genetics, and perhaps changing sex several times during its long life (20 years or more).

Sections
A phylogenetic study in 2016 by Ohi-toma et. al recognized 15 sections in the genus.

Species
Arisaema abei Seriz - Shikoku Island in Japan
Arisaema aequinoctiale Nakai & F.Maek - Honshu, Kyushu, and Shikoku Islands in Japan
Arisaema agasthyanum Sivad. & C.S.Kumar - southwestern India
Arisaema album  N.E.Br. - Arunachal Pradesh and Assam in eastern India
Arisaema amurense Maxim. - Russian Far East, China, North Korea
Arisaema anomalum Hemsl. - Peninsular Malaysia
Arisaema aprile J.Murata - Izu Peninsula on Honshu Island in Japan
Arisaema aridum H.Li - Yunnan
Arisaema asperatum N.E.Br - China, eastern Himalayas, Arunachal Pradesh, Myanmar
Arisaema auriculatum Buchet - Sichuan, Hunan, and Yunnan Provinces in China
Arisaema austroyunnanense H.Li - Yunnan, Vietnam
Arisaema averyanovii V.D.Nguyen & P.C.Boyce - Vietnam
Arisaema balansae Engl. - Laos, Thailand, Vietnam, southern China
Arisaema bannaense H.Li - Arunachal Pradesh, Myanmar, Yunnan
Arisaema barbatum Buchet - Yunnan, Thailand, Java, Bali
Arisaema barnesii C.E.C.Fisch - India, Sri Lanka
Arisaema bockii Engl. - China
Arisaema bonatianum Engl. - Sichuan, Yunnan
Arisaema bottae Schott - Yemen
Arisaema brucei H.Li, R.Li & J.Murata - Yunnan
Arisaema calcareum H.Li - Yunnan
Arisaema candidissimum  W.W.Sm. - Tibet, Sichuan, Yunnan
Arisaema caudatum Engl. - western India
Arisaema chuanxiense Z.Y.Zhu, B.Q.Min & S.J.Zhu - Sichuan
Arisaema chumponense Gagnep. - Thailand
Arisaema ciliatum H.Li - Sichuan, Yunnan
Arisaema clavatum Buchet - Chongqing, Guizhou, Hubei, Sichuan
Arisaema concinnum Schott - Tibet, Assam, Bhutan, Nepal, Myanmar, eastern + northern India 
Arisaema condaoense V.D.Nguyen - Condao Island in Vietnam
Arisaema consanguineum Schott - southern China, Himalayas, Indochina
Arisaema constrictum E.Barnes - Sri Lanka
Arisaema cordatum N.E.Br. - Guangxi, Guangdong, Lantao 
Arisaema costatum (Wall.) Mart. - Tibet, Nepal
Arisaema cucullatum M.Hotta - Honshu in Japan
Arisaema dahaiense H.Li - Yunnan, Myanmar
Arisaema decipiens Schott - southern China, eastern Himalayas, Vietnam
 Arisaema dracontium  (L.) Schott - Green dragon - Nuevo León + Veracruz in Mexico; much of eastern United States and eastern Canada
Arisaema echinatum (Wall.) Schott - Tibet, Nepal, Yunnan, eastern Himalayas
Arisaema echinoides H.Li - Yunnan
Arisaema ehimense J.Murata & J.Ohno - Shikoku in Japan
Arisaema elephas Buchet - Bhutan, Myanmar, Tibet, Chongqing, Gansu, Guizhou, Sichuan, Yunnan 
Arisaema enneaphyllum Hochst. ex A.Rich. - Ethiopia, Sudan, Kenya, Uganda, Yemen
Arisaema erubescens (Wall.) Schott - Nepal
Arisaema exappendiculatum H.Hara - Nepal, Tibet
Arisaema fargesii Buchet - Tibet, Chongqing, Gansu, Hubei, Hunan, Sichuan, Yunnan 
Arisaema filiforme  (Reinw.) Blume - Borneo, Java, Malaysia, Sumatra
Arisaema fimbriatum Masters - Thailand, Peninsular Malaysia, Pulau Lankawi
Arisaema flavum (Forsk.) Schott - Ethiopia, Somalia, Arabian Peninsula, Pakistan, Afghanistan, Nepal, Assam, Himalayas, Tibet, Yunnan, Sichuan
Arisaema formosanum (Hayata) Hayata - Taiwan
Arisaema franchetianum Engl. - Tibet, Myanmar, Guangxi, Guizhou, Hunan, Sichuan, Yunnan 
Arisaema fraternum Schott - Assam
Arisaema galeatum N.E.Br. - Tibet, Bhutan, Assam, Arunachal Pradesh, Myanmar
Arisaema garrettii Gagnep. - Thailand
Arisaema ghaticum (Sardesai, S.P.Gaikwad & S.R.Yadav) Punekar & Kumaran - Maharashtra
Arisaema grapsospadix Hayata - Fujian, Taiwan
Arisaema griffithii Schott - Nepal, Darjiling, Tibet
Arisaema hainanense C.Y.Wu ex H.Li, Y.Shiao & S.L.Tseng - Hainan
Arisaema handelii Stapf ex Hand.-Mazz. - Tibet, Myanmar, Yunnan
Arisaema heterocephalum Koidz. - Ryukyu Islands
Arisaema heterophyllum  - Korea, Japan, widespread across much of China
Arisaema hunanense Hand.-Mazz. - Chongqing, Guangdong, Hubei, Hunan, Sichuan
Arisaema ilanense J.C.Wang - Taiwan
Arisaema inclusum (N.E.Br.) N.E.Br. ex B.D.Jacks. - Java, Sumatra, Flores
Arisaema intermedium Blume - Tibet, Yunnan, Nepal, eastern Himalayas
Arisaema ishizuchiense Murata - Honshu, Shikoku
Arisaema iyoanum Makino - Honshu, Shikoku
Arisaema jacquemontii Blume - Afghanistan, northern Pakistan, Tibet, Nepal, Bhutan, Himalayas of northern + eastern India
Arisaema jethompsonii Thiyagaraj & P.Daniel - Tamil Nadu
Arisaema jingdongense H.Peng & H.Li - Yunnan
Arisaema kawashimae Seriz - Ryukyu Islands
Arisaema kerrii Craib - Thailand
Arisaema kishidae Makino ex Nakai - Honshu
Arisaema kiushianum Makino - Honshu, Kyushu
Arisaema kuratae Seriz - Honshu
Arisaema lackneri Engl. - Yunnan, Myanmar
Arisaema laminatum Blume - Borneo, Java, Bali, Sumatra, Peninsular Malaysia, Borneo, Palawan 
Arisaema leschenaultii Blume - southern India, Sri Lanka
Arisaema lichiangense W.W.Sm. - Sichuan, Yunnan
Arisaema lidaense J.Murata & S.K.Wu - Yunnan
Arisaema lihenganum  J.Murata & S.K.Wu - Guangxi
Arisaema limbatum Nakai & F.Maek. - Japan
Arisaema linearifolium Gusman & J.T.Yin - Yunnan
Arisaema lingyunense H.Li - Guangxi, Assam, Myanmar
Arisaema lobatum Engl. - China
Arisaema longipedunculatum M.Hotta - Japan
Arisaema longitubum Z.X.Ma. -China
Arisaema macrospathum Benth. - Mexico (from Oaxaca north to Sinaloa + Nuevo León)
Arisaema maekawae J.Murata & S.Kakish. - Honshu
Arisaema mairei H.Lév. - Sichuan, Yunnan
Arisaema maximowiczii (Engl.) Nakai - Kyushu
Arisaema maxwellii Hett. & Gusman - Thailand
Arisaema melanostomum Z.X. Ma, X. Yun Wang & W.Y. Du - China
Arisaema meleagris Buchet - Chongqing, Sichuan, Yunnan
Arisaema menglaense Y.H.Ji, H.Li & Z.F.Xu - Guangxi
Arisaema microspadix Engl. - Java, Timor
Arisaema mildbraedii Engl. - Zaire, Kenya, Uganda, Rwanda, Burundi 
Arisaema minamitanii Seriz - Kyushu
Arisaema minus (Seriz.) J.Murata - Honshu
Arisaema monophyllum Nakai - Honshu
Arisaema mooneyanum  M.G.Gilbert & Mayo - Ethiopia
Arisaema muratae Gusman & J.T.Yin - Yunnan
Arisaema muricaudatum Sivad. - Kerala
Arisaema murrayi (J.Graham) Hook. - Maharashtra
Arisaema nagiense Tom.Kobay., K.Sasam. & J.Murata - Honshu
Arisaema nambae Kitam. - Honshu
Arisaema negishii Makino - Hachijo + Miyake Islands of Japan
Arisaema nepenthoides (Wall.) Mart. - Nepal, Tibet, Yunnan, Bhutan, Assam, Myanmar
Arisaema nikoense Nakai - Honshu
Arisaema nilamburense Sivad. - Kerala
Arisaema odoratum J.Murata & S.K.Wu - Yunnan
Arisaema ogatae Koidz. - Kyushu
Arisaema omkoiense Gusman - Thailand
Arisaema ornatum Miq. - Sumatra
Arisaema ovale Nakai - Japan
Arisaema pachystachyum Hett. & Gusman - Thailand
Arisaema pallidum Engl. - Sumatra
Arisaema parisifolia J.Murata - Laos, Vietnam
Arisaema parvum N.E.Br. ex Hemsl. - Tibet, Sichuan, Yunnan 
Arisaema pattaniense Gagnep. - Thailand
Arisaema penicillatum N.E.Br. - Guangdong, Guangxi, Hainan, Taiwan
Arisaema petelotii K.Krause - Yunnan, Vietnam
Arisaema petiolulatum Hook.f. - Arunachal Pradesh, Assam, Myanmar, Yunnan
Arisaema pianmaense H.Li - Yunnan
Arisaema pingbianense H.Li - Yunnan, Vietnam
Arisaema polyphyllum (Blanco) Merr. - Philippines, Sulawesi
Arisaema prazeri Hook.f. - Yunnan, Thailand, Myanmar
Arisaema propinquum Schott - Himalayas (Pakistan, Nepal, Tibet, India)
Arisaema psittacus E.Barnes - Kerala
Arisaema pusillum (Peck) Nash - eastern Canada, eastern United States
Arisaema quinatum (Nutt.) Schott - southeastern United States
Arisaema quinquelobatum H.Li & J.Murata - Yunnan
Arisaema ramulosum Alderw. - Java, Timor
Arisaema ringens (Thunb.) Schott - Korea, Japan, Ryukyu Islands, Jiangsu, Taiwan, Zhejiang 
Arisaema rostratum V.D.Nguyen & P.C.Boyce - Vietnam
Arisaema roxburghii Kunth - Assam, Indochina
Arisaema rubrirhizomatum H.Li & J.Murata - Yunnan
Arisaema ruwenzoricum  N.E.Br. - Zaire, Uganda, Burundi
Arisaema sachalinense (Miyabe & Kudô) J.Murata - Sakhalin in Russia, Hokkaido in Japan
Arisaema saddlepeakense P.S.N.Rao & S.K.Srivast - Andaman Islands
Arisaema sarracenioides E.Barnes & C.E.C.Fisch. - Kerala
Arisaema saxatile Buchet - Sichuan, Yunnan
Arisaema sazensoo  (Blume) Makino - Kyushu
Arisaema schimperianum Schott - Zaire, Ethiopia, Sudan, Uganda 
Arisaema scortechinii Hook.f - Peninsular Malaysia
Arisaema seppikoense Kitam. - Honshu
Arisaema serratum (Thunb.) Schott - Primorye, Korea, Kuril Islands, Japan, northeastern China
Arisaema setosum A.Sudh.Rao & D.M.Verma - Arunachal Pradesh
Arisaema siamicum Gagnep. - Thailand, Vietnam
Arisaema siangense Gusman - Arunachal Pradesh
Arisaema sikokianum Franch. & Sav. - Shikoku
Arisaema silvestrii Pamp. - China
Arisaema sinii K.Krause - China
Arisaema sizemoreae Hett. & Gusman - Thailand
Arisaema smitinandii S.Y.Hu - Thailand
Arisaema somalense M.G.Gilbert & Mayo - Somalia
Arisaema souliei Buchet - Sichuan, Chongqing
Arisaema speciosum  (Wall.) Mart. - Cobra lily - Tibet, Nepal, Assam, Bhutan
Arisaema stewardsonii Britton - eastern Canada, eastern United States
Arisaema sukotaiense Gagnep. - Yunnan, Thailand
Arisaema taiwanense  J.Murata - Taiwan
Arisaema tengtsungense H.Li - Yunnan, Myanmar
Arisaema ternatipartitum Makino - Japan
Arisaema thunbergii Blume - Japan, Korea, Taiwan
Arisaema tortuosum (Wall.) Schott - Whipcord cobra lily - India, Sri Lanka, Bangladesh, Himalayas, Nepal, Assam, Pakistan, Tibet, Yunnan, Myanmar
Arisaema tosaense Makino - Japan
Arisaema translucens C.E.C.Fisch - Nilgiri Mountains in Tamil Nadu in India
Arisaema triphyllum (L.) Schott in H.W.Schott & S.L.Endlicher - Jack-in-the-pulpit - eastern Canada, eastern United States
Arisaema tsangpoense J.T.Yin & Gusman - Tibet
Arisaema tuberculatum C.E.C.Fisch. - Nilgiri Mountains in Tamil Nadu in India
Arisaema ulugurense M.G.Gilbert & Mayo - Uluguru Mountains in Tanzania
Arisaema umbrinum Ridl. - Borneo
Arisaema undulatifolium Nakai - Honshu + Shikoku in Japan
Arisaema utile Hook.f. ex Schott - Tibet, Yunnan, Nepal, Bhutan, Himalayas of India + Pakistan
Arisaema vexillatum H.Hara & H.Ohashi - Tibet, Nepal
Arisaema victoriae V.D.Nguyen - Yunnan, Guangxi, Vietnam
Arisaema wangmoense M.T.An, H.H.Zhang & Q.Lin - Guizhou
Arisaema wardii C.Marquand & Airy Shaw - Qinghai, Shanxi, Yunnan, Tibet
 Arisaema wattii J. D. Hook. - Assam, Myanmar, Tibet, Yunnan
Arisaema wilsonii Engl. - Tibet, Bhutan, Gansu, Sichuan, Yunnan
Arisaema wrayi Hemsl. - Thailand, Sabah, Malaysia
Arisaema xuanweiense H.Li - Yunnan
Arisaema yamatense (Nakai) Nakai - Yamatense cobra lily - Honshu
Arisaema yunnanense Buchet - Thailand, Myanmar, Vietnam, Guizhou, Sichuan, Yunnan 
Arisaema zhui H.Li - Yunnan

References

Bibliography

External links

 Arisaema information and links 
 Arisaema links and information 
 Arisaema pictures 
 Jack in the Pulpit information 
 Arisaema Home Page - Japanese Arisaema pictures
 

 
Araceae genera